Xanlıqpəyə is a village de jure in the Shusha District of Azerbaijan, de facto in the Shushi Province of the self-proclaimed Republic of Artsakh. The village had an Azerbaijani-majority prior to their expulsion during the First Nagorno-Karabakh War.

References 

Populated places in Shusha District